This list of Mesozoic birds is a comprehensive list of all Mesozoic dinosaurs that have been assigned to the clade Avialae (birds, in the broadest sense). The list includes all commonly accepted genera, but also genera that are now considered invalid, doubtful (nomen dubium), or were not formally published (nomen nudum), as well as junior synonyms of more established names, and genera that are no longer considered avialan. The list currently includes 263 genera.

Scope and terminology 
There is no official, canonical list of Mesozoic bird genera, but some of the more complete ones include Holtz's list of Mesozoic dinosaurs, Molina-Perez & Larramendi's list of theropods, and Mickey Mortimer's Theropod Database. Lists of ex-birds are generally rare, but one example is the "Ex-Saurischian Taxa and Basal Saurischians" section of the Theropod Database.

Authors and year 
The authors column lists the authors of the formal description responsible for the erection of the genus listed. They are not necessarily the same as the authors of the type species, as sometimes a species from one genus is determined sufficiently distinct to warrant the erection of a new genus to house it. If this is the case, only the latter authors will be listed. The year column notes the year the genus' description was published.

Status 
Naming conventions and terminology follow the International Code of Zoological Nomenclature (ICZN). Technical terms used include:

 Junior synonym: A name which describes the same taxon as a previously published name. If two or more genera are formally designated and the type specimens are later assigned to the same genus, the first to be published (in chronological order) is the senior synonym, and all other instances are junior synonyms. Senior synonyms are generally used, except by special decision of the ICZN, but junior synonyms cannot be used again, even if deprecated. Junior synonymy is often subjective, unless the genera described were both based on the same type specimen.
 Nomen nudum (Latin for "naked name"): A name that has appeared in print but has not yet been formally published by the standards of the ICZN. Nomina nuda (the plural form) are invalid, and are therefore not italicized as a proper generic name would be. If the name is later formally published, that name is no longer a nomen nudum and will be italicized on this list. Often, the formally published name will differ from any nomina nuda that describe the same specimen.
 Preoccupied name: A name that is formally published, but which has already been used for another taxon. This second use is invalid (as are all subsequent uses) and the name must be replaced. 
 Nomen dubium (Latin for "dubious name"): A name describing a fossil with no unique diagnostic features. As this can be an extremely subjective and controversial designation, this term is not used on this list.

Age 
The age column denotes the epoch of geologic time to which the fossils date. Genera that are invalid, misidentified, or otherwise do not represent a valid Mesozoic bird are listed as age N/A because there was never a time in which a Mesozoic bird by that generic name actually lived.

Location and notes 
The location column designates the geographic region where remains of the relevant genus have been found. The regions used are countries, despite the fact that there were no political boundaries in Mesozoic times; they are only used for convenience. Genera that are invalid, misidentified, or otherwise do not represent a valid Mesozoic bird are listed as location N/A because there was never a place in which a Mesozoic bird by that generic name actually lived. The notes column is a collection of annotations on the scientific significance and taxonomic history of listed genera, as well as elaborations on the information presented in other columns.

The list

See also 
 List of dinosaur genera - for non-avialan dinosaurs

References 

Lists of prehistoric reptiles
Dinosaur-related lists
Lists of prehistoric animal genera (alphabetic)